Troctopsocidae is a family of Psocodea (formerly Psocoptera) belonging to the suborder Troctomorpha. The family consists of seven genera.

Sources 

 Lienhard, C. & Smithers, C. N. 2002. "Psocoptera (Insecta)": World Catalogue and Bibliography. Instrumenta Biodiversitatis, vol. 5. Muséum d'histoire naturelle, Geneva, Switzerland.

Psocoptera families
Troctomorpha